In telecommunications and signal processing, baseband is the range of frequencies occupied by a signal that has not been modulated to higher frequencies. Baseband signals typically originate from transducers, converting some other variable into an electrical signal.  For example, the electronic output of a microphone is a baseband signal that is analogous to the applied voice audio. In conventional analog radio broadcasting, the baseband audio signal is used to modulate an RF carrier signal of a much higher frequency.

A baseband signal may have frequency components going all the way down to DC, or at least it will have a high ratio bandwidth.  A modulated baseband signal is called a passband signal.  This occupies a higher range of frequencies and has a lower ratio and fractional bandwidth.

Various uses

Baseband signal 
A baseband signal or lowpass signal is a signal that can include frequencies that are very near zero, by comparison with its highest frequency (for example, a sound waveform can be considered as a baseband signal, whereas a radio signal or any other modulated signal is not).

A baseband bandwidth is equal to the highest frequency of a signal or system, or an upper bound on such frequencies, for example the upper cut-off frequency of a low-pass filter. By contrast, passband bandwidth is the difference between a highest frequency and a nonzero lowest frequency.

Baseband channel 
A baseband channel or lowpass channel (or system, or network) is a communication channel that can transfer frequencies that are very near zero. Examples are serial cables and local area networks (LANs), as opposed to passband channels such as radio frequency channels and passband filtered wires of the analog telephone network. Frequency division multiplexing (FDM) allows an analog telephone wire to carry a baseband telephone call, concurrently as one or several carrier-modulated telephone calls.

Digital baseband transmission 

Digital baseband transmission, also known as line coding, aims at transferring a digital bit stream over baseband channel, typically an unfiltered wire, contrary to passband transmission, also known as carrier-modulated transmission. Passband transmission makes communication possible over a bandpass filtered channel, such as the telephone network local-loop or a band-limited wireless channel.

Baseband transmission in Ethernet 
The word "BASE" in Ethernet physical layer standards, for example 10BASE5, 100BASE-TX and 1000BASE-SX, implies baseband digital transmission (i.e. that a line code and an unfiltered wire are used).

Baseband processor 
A baseband processor also known as BP or BBP is used to process the down-converted digital signal to retrieve essential data for a wireless digital system. The baseband processing block in GNSS receivers is responsible for providing observable data: that is, code pseudo-ranges and carrier phase measurements, as well as navigation data.

Equivalent baseband signal 

An equivalent baseband signal or equivalent lowpass signal is—in analog and digital modulation methods for (passband) signals with constant or varying carrier frequency (for example ASK, PSK QAM, and FSK)—a complex valued representation of the modulated physical signal (the so-called passband signal or RF signal). The equivalent baseband signal is  where  is the inphase signal,  the quadrature phase signal, and  the imaginary unit. The frequency spectrum of this signal includes negative as well as positive frequencies. The physical passband signal corresponds to 

where  is the carrier angular frequency in rad/s.

Modulation 
A signal at baseband is often used to modulate a higher frequency carrier signal in order that it may be transmitted via radio. Modulation results in shifting the signal up to much higher frequencies (radio frequencies, or RF) than it originally spanned. A key consequence of the usual double-sideband amplitude modulation (AM) is that the range of frequencies the signal spans (its spectral bandwidth) is doubled. Thus, the RF bandwidth of a signal (measured from the lowest frequency as opposed to 0 Hz) is twice its baseband bandwidth. Steps may be taken to reduce this effect, such as single-sideband modulation. Conversely, some transmission schemes such as frequency modulation use even more bandwidth.

The figure below shows AM modulation:

See also 

 Complex envelope
 Broadband
 In-phase and quadrature components
 Narrowband
 Wideband

References 

Signal processing